
Gmina Goszczyn is a rural gmina (administrative district) in Grójec County, Masovian Voivodeship, in east-central Poland.

Villages
Gmina Goszczyn contains the villages and settlements of Bądków, Bądków-Kolonia, Długowola, Goszczyn, Jakubów, Józefów, Modrzewina, Nowa Długowola, Olszew, Romanów and Sielec.

Neighbouring gminas
Gmina Goszczyn is bordered by the gminas of Belsk Duży, Jasieniec, Mogielnica and Promna.

References
Polish official population figures 2006

Goszczyn
Grójec County